Montana State Hospital is located in Warm Springs, Montana, just off of I-90 near Anaconda, Montana.

The hospital is the only publicly operated psychiatric hospital in the state.  It was founded by the territorial government in 1877.  The hospital was once Montana's largest unincorporated community.  Its peak census was in 1954 when the facility housed 1,964 patients.

Today the census averages under 200 patients, primarily placed by civil court commitment action.  The facility also includes a forensic unit for individuals who have either been found mentally ill or are undergoing evaluation while unfit to proceed. Exceptionally violent patients may also reside on the forensic unit regardless of criminal charges. The hospital is no longer* licensed by the State of Montana and certified for participation in the federal Medicare and Medicaid programs, due to issues with State inspections.

External links
Official Montana State Hospital website

Hospital buildings completed in 1877
Hospitals in Montana
Buildings and structures in Deer Lodge County, Montana
1877 establishments in Montana Territory
Psychiatric hospitals in Montana